Maxwell Hall is a historic home located near Patuxent, Charles County, Maryland. It is a -story, gambrel-roofed frame house with massive external chimneys.

Maxwell Hall was listed on the National Register of Historic Places in 1974.

References

External links
, including photo from 1972, at Maryland Historical Trust
Maxwell Hall

Houses in Charles County, Maryland
Houses on the National Register of Historic Places in Maryland
National Register of Historic Places in Charles County, Maryland